Sugar Bush is an unincorporated community located entirely within the town of Maple Creek in northwest Outagamie County, Wisconsin, United States. Sugar Bush is classified as a Class U6 Community by the USGS, being a populated place located wholly or substantially outside the boundaries of any incorporated place or CDP with a recognized authoritative common name.

Postal service is provided by the New London post office, ZIP code 54961.

History
The Sugar Bush post office operated from 1858 until 1972. The community was named from a grove of sugar maples near the town site.

Geography

Education
The School District of New London operates an elementary school in Sugar Bush.

Transportation
Sugar Bush is located on Outagamie County Highway WW, immediately east of U.S. Highway 45, a major north-south corridor in the State of Wisconsin, and just west of Outagamie County Highway D.

References

External links
New London Press-Star Newspaper
Sugar Bush Elementary School, School District of New London
USGS GNIS in Google Map

Unincorporated communities in Outagamie County, Wisconsin
Unincorporated communities in Wisconsin